The Delaware Beaches are located along the Atlantic Ocean in the eastern part of Sussex County, Delaware, which is in the southern part of the state.  In addition to beaches along the ocean, the area offers many amenities, including restaurants, nightlife, fishing, golf courses, boardwalk areas, and tax-free shopping. The beaches are popular tourist destinations for residents from the nearby areas of Washington, D.C., Baltimore, Wilmington, Philadelphia, South Jersey, and Hampton Roads. Out of the 30 states with coastline, the Delaware Beaches ranked number 1 in water quality in 2011 and again in 2014.

List of beaches

Beaches in Delaware from north to south:
 Delaware River / Delaware Bay:
 Augustine Beach
 Woodland Beach
 Fraland Beach
 Pickering Beach
 Bowers Beach
 Bennett's Pier Beach
 Big Stone Beach
 Slaughter Beach
 Fowler Beach
 Primehook Beach
 Broadkill Beach 
 Lewes (on Delaware Bay)
Cape Henlopen State Park
North Shores
Henlopen Acres
Rehoboth Beach
Dewey Beach
Indian Beach
Delaware Seashore State Park
 Tower Beach
 Coin Beach
Sussex Shores
Bethany Beach
Middlesex Beach
South Bethany
York Beach
Fenwick Island State Park
Fenwick Island

History

In 2003, the Delaware Senate passed a bill for the coastal area of Delaware to be referred to as the "Delaware Beaches", as Delaware residents refer to their coastline as the "beach" and not the "shore" like the Jersey Shore in New Jersey. The bill called for DelDOT to change signage directing motorists to the beaches from "Shore Points" to "Beaches".

Demographics
The Delaware Beaches area, particularly the Cape Region, tend to be more affluent and populous than western portions of Sussex County. The combined population of all of the ZIP codes in the Delaware Beaches area is about 43,851 (2009). The median household income in 2009 was $77,030.

Economy
According to SeaGrant Delaware, the Delaware Beaches generate $6.9 billion annually and over $711 million in tax revenue.

See also
 List of beaches
List of beaches in New England
 List of beaches in the United States

References

External links

Delaware Online - Delaware Beaches
Beach-Net.com - Information on Delaware Beaches
Rehoboth.com - For all Vacation Information
Town of Bethany Beach

 
 
Landforms of Sussex County, Delaware
Tourist attractions in Sussex County, Delaware
Deleware
Beaches